Abba Kovner (14 March 1918 – 25 September 1987) was a Polish-Jewish partisan leader, and later an Israeli poet and writer. In the Vilna Ghetto, his manifesto was the first time that a target of the Holocaust identified the German plan to murder all Jews. His attempt to organize a ghetto uprising failed, but he fled into the forest, joined Soviet partisans, and survived the war. After the war, Kovner led Nakam, a paramilitary organization of Holocaust survivors who sought to take genocidal revenge by murdering six million German people, but Kovner was arrested in the British zone of Occupied Germany before he could successfully carry out his plans. He made aliyah to the State of Israel in 1947. Considered one of the greatest authors of Modern Hebrew poetry, Kovner was awarded the Israel Prize in 1970.

Biography
Abba (Abel) Kovner was born on 14 March 1918, in Oszmiana (now Ashmyany Belarus). His parents were Rochel (Rosa) Taubman and Israel Kovner and his brothers were Gedalia and the youngest Michel. In 1927 family moved to Wilno (now Vilnius Lithuania) to Popławska Street. Abba Kovner was educated at the Hebrew Tarbut Gymnasium in Wilno and Stefan Batory University’s Faculty of Arts. His father had a shop in Wilno selling leather on Julian Klaczko Street. While pursuing his studies, Abba became an active member in the socialist Zionist youth movement HaShomer HaTzair. Abba Kovner was a cousin of the Israeli Communist Party leader and anti-Zionist activist Meir Vilner.

World War II
After 1939 invasion of Poland, Wilno, where Kovner lived, fell into the Soviet occupation zone. In 1941, Nazi Germany invaded the Soviet Union and captured Vilnius (Wilno) from the Soviets. All Jews were ordered by the occupiers to move into the Vilna Ghetto, but Kovner managed to hide with several Jewish friends in a Dominican convent headed by Polish Catholic nun Anna Borkowska in the city's suburbs. He soon returned to the ghetto. Kovner concluded that in order for any revolt to be successful, a Jewish resistance fighting force needed to be assembled.

At the start of 1942, Kovner released a manifesto in the ghetto, titled "Let us not go like lambs to the slaughter!", although the authorship has been contested. The manifesto was the first instance in which a target of the Holocaust identified that Hitler had decided to kill all the Jews of Europe, and the first use of the phrase "like sheep to the slaughter" in a Holocaust context. Kovner informed the remaining Jews that their relatives who had been taken away had been murdered in the Ponary massacre and argued that it was best to die fighting. Nobody at that time knew for certain of more than local killings, and many received the manifesto with skepticism. For others, this proclamation represented a turning point in an understanding of the situation and how to respond to it. The idea of resistance was disseminated from Vilnius by youth movement couriers, mainly women, to the ghettos of occupied Poland, occupied Belarus and of occupied Lithuania.

Kovner, Yitzhak Wittenberg, Alexander Bogen and others formed the United Partisan Organization ("Fareynikte Partizaner Organizatsye", or FPO), one of the first armed underground organizations in the Jewish ghettos under Nazi occupation. Kovner became its leader in July 1943, after Wittenberg was named by a tortured comrade and turned himself in to prevent an attack on the ghetto. The FPO planned to fight the Germans when the end of the ghetto came, but circumstances and the opposition of the ghetto leaders made this impossible and they escaped to the forests.

From September 1943 until the return of the Soviet army in July 1944, Kovner, along with his lieutenants Vitka Kempner and Rozka Korczak, commanded a partisan group called the Avengers ("Nokmim") in the forests near Vilna and engaged in sabotage and guerrilla attacks against the Germans and their local collaborators.  The Avengers were one of four predominantly Jewish groups that operated within the command of the Soviet-led partisans. A log of partisan activity recorded that 30 fighters from "Avengers" and "To Victory" partisan groups participated in the massacre of at least 38 civilians at Koniuchy in January 1944.

After the liberation of Vilnius by the Soviet Red Army in July 1944, Kovner became one of the founders of the Berihah movement, helping Jews escape Eastern Europe after the war.

Nakam

At the end of the war, Kovner was one of the founders of a secret organization Nakam (revenge), also known as Dam Yisrael Noter ("the blood of Israel avenges", with the acronym DIN meaning "judgement") whose purpose was to seek revenge for the Holocaust. Two plans were formulated.  Plan A was to kill a large number of German citizens by poisoning the water supplies of Hamburg, Frankfurt, Munich, and Nuremberg, Nakam intended to kill 6 million Germans.  Plan B was to kill SS prisoners held in Allied POW camps. In pursuit of Plan A, members of the group were infiltrated into water and sewage plants in several cities, while Kovner went to Palestine in search of a suitable poison. Kovner discussed Nakam with Yishuv leaders, though it is not clear how much he told them and he doesn't seem to have received much support. According to Kovner's own account, Chaim Weizmann approved when he pitched Plan B and put him in touch with the scientist Ernst Bergmann, who gave the job of preparing poison to Ephraim Katzir (later president of Israel) and his brother Aharon. Historians have expressed doubt over Weizmann's involvement since he was overseas at the time Kovner specified. The Katzir brothers confirmed that they gave poison to Kovner, but said that he only mentioned Plan B and they denied that Weizmann could be involved. As Kovner and an accomplice were returning to Europe on a British ship, they threw the poison overboard when Kovner was arrested.  He was imprisoned for a few months in Cairo and Plan A was abandoned.

In April 1946, members of Nakam broke into a bakery used to supply bread for the Langwasser internment camp near Nuremberg, where many German POWs were being held.  They coated many of the loaves with arsenic but were disturbed and fled before finishing their work.  More than 2,200 of the German prisoners fell ill and 207 were hospitalized, but no deaths were reported.

Israel

Kovner joined the Haganah in December 1947, and soon after Israel declared independence in May 1948 he became a captain in the Givati Brigade of the IDF. During the 1948 Arab–Israeli War he became known for his "battle pages", headed "Death to the invaders!", that contained news from the Egyptian front and essays designed to keep up morale. However, the tone of the pages, which called for revenge for the Holocaust and referred to the Egyptian enemy as vipers and dogs, upset many Israeli political and military leaders.  The leader of HaShomer Hatzair, Meir Ya'ari accused him of spreading "Fascist horror propaganda." His first battle page, entitled "Failure", started a controversy that still continues today when it accused the Nitzanim garrison of cowardice for surrendering to an overwhelming Egyptian force.

From 1946 to his death, Kovner was a resident of Kibbutz Ein HaHoresh. He was active in Mapam as well as in HaShomer HaTzair, but never took on a formal political role. He played a major part in the design and construction of several Holocaust museums, including the Diaspora Museum in Tel Aviv. He died in 1987 (aged 69) of laryngeal cancer, perhaps due to his lifelong heavy smoking, at his home in Ein HaHoresh. He was survived by his wife, Vitka Kempner, who married Kovner in 1946, and their two children.

Legacy
Kovner's book of poetry  ("Ad Lo-Or"), 1947, describes in lyric-dramatic narrative the struggle of the Resistance partisans in the swamps and forests of Eastern Europe. Ha-Mafteach Tzalal, ("The Key Drowned"), 1951, is also about this struggle. Pridah Me-ha-darom ("Departure from the South"), 1949, and  Panim el Panim ("Face to Face"), 1953, continue the story with the War of Independence.

Kovner's story is the basis for the song "Six Million Germans / Nakam", by Daniel Kahn & The Painted Bird.

Kovner testified about his experiences during the war at the trial of Adolf Eichmann.

Awards and honors 
 In 1968, Kovner was awarded the Brenner Prize for literature.
 In 1970, Kovner was awarded the Israel Prize for literature.
In 1986, Kovner was awarded the Prime Minister's Prize for Hebrew Literary Works.

Further reading
 See The Modern Hebrew Poem Itself (2003), 
 See My Little Sister and Selected Poems, trans. Shirley Kaufman (1986), 
 See The Avengers (2000), by Rich Cohen,

See also
 Anna Borkowska
 Alexander Bogen
 Bielski partisans
 List of Israel Prize recipients
 Nakam

References

Bibliography
 Dina Porat, The Fall of a Sparrow: The Life and Times of Abba Kovner (Palo Alto, Stanford University Press, 2009). .

External links

 Chronicles of the Vilna Ghetto: wartime photographs & documents – vilnaghetto.com
 Abba Kovner Biography
 Abba Kovner and Resistance in the Vilna Ghetto
 Abba Kovner - World War II Partisan and Founder of The Avengers

1918 births
1987 deaths
People from Ashmyany
Belarusian Jews
Polish emigrants to Mandatory Palestine
Ethnic cleansing of Germans
Israeli people of Belarusian-Jewish descent
Israeli poets
Israel Prize in literature recipients
Brenner Prize recipients
Hebrew-language poets
Kibbutzniks
Jewish poets
Soviet partisans
Jewish partisans
Vilna Ghetto inmates
Haganah members
Israeli military personnel
Israeli people of the 1948 Arab–Israeli War
20th-century poets
Recipients of Prime Minister's Prize for Hebrew Literary Works
Nakam
Deaths from cancer in Israel
Deaths from laryngeal cancer
People from Vilna Governorate
Prisoners and detainees of the British military